The FCS Bowl or FCS National Bowl is an independently operated annual post-season college football all-star game, played each December in Florida since 2014. The game showcases NFL draft prospects of those collegiate players who have completed their eligibility in NCAA Division I Football Championship Subdivision (FCS), although the game does feature players from other football divisions as well. The game is played as a doubleheader with the National Bowl Game.

History
The FCS Bowl was first played in December 2014 at Riccardo Silva Stadium on the campus of Florida International University (FIU). The game is organized by East Preps LLC, who operate the game independently. After two years, the game moved to Municipal Stadium in Daytona Beach, Florida.

The game and an associated scouting combine provide opportunity for players from smaller colleges to get exposure with scouts from various professional leagues, including the NFL and CFL. Additionally, NFL Films distributes game and practice film to NFL teams. Organizers report that 26 players from the December 2015 games (National Bowl Game and FCS Bowl) reached the NFL in some capacity. At the December 2016 game, 14 NFL teams were represented, with over 30 scouts in attendance.

Game results

MVPs
Overall MVPs of each game are listed below. Some additional awards not listed are also given, for offensive and defensive player of each team, special teams player, lineman, and the James Pratt Courage Award.

See also
List of college bowl games

References

Further reading

External links
 
 Twitter feed

College football all-star games
Recurring sporting events established in 2014
American football in Florida